Christiaan Frederik Beyers (23 September 1869 – 8 December 1914) was a Boer general during the Second Boer War.

Biography
As a young man, he went to the Transvaal, where he took a prominent part on the Boer side in the South African War, winning high distinction in the field and bearing the rank of general when peace was made in 1902. Beyers had much influence, as soldier and statesman, among the Dutch-speaking people of South Africa, and was, with Generals Botha and Smuts, though in a less degree than they, one of the recognized leaders of the Transvaal Boers.

When responsible government was granted to the Transvaal, Beyers became speaker of the Lower House. He showed in the speaker's chair remarkable gifts. He was acute, tolerant and rigidly impartial, thus making a deep impression upon English-speaking South Africans, who would have supported his claims to be the first speaker of the first South African House of Assembly, had they been pressed by Louis Botha, the first Prime Minister. Instead, Beyers was made commandant general of the Citizen Forces of the Union Defence Force of South Africa, and in that capacity paid a visit to Great Britain, Germany, Switzerland and the Netherlands in 1912.

A man of fine physique, of passionate nature, and of profound religious convictions, Beyers, as commandant general of South Africa, was entertained with marked attentions during his visit to Germany by Kaiser Wilhelm II. When World War I broke out, he set himself in almost open opposition to the policy of the Botha government. For some months, this opposition smouldered. Then, at a moment when the South African expeditionary force was being mobilized for the invasion of German South-West Africa, and when rebellion was already smouldering among the irreconcilables of the South African Dutch, Beyers resigned his post as commandant general in a letter addressed to General Smuts, then Minister of Defence, and published in Het Volk, an anti-government journal. In this letter he declared that he had always disapproved the Government's intention to invade German South-West Africa and that this disapproval was shared by the great majority of the Dutch-speaking people of the Union. General Smuts replied in a stern letter declaring that the war was a test of the loyalty to their pledged word of the Dutch-speaking people, and accepting Beyers' resignation. He had a friendship with JF Naudé and Naudé named his son CFB Naudé after him.

A few weeks later Beyers took the field as a leader of the Boer Rebels against the government, only to be overwhelmed by the government troops under the command of General Botha, to be driven from pillar to post as a fugitive, and to be wounded and consequently drowned on 8 December 1914, while trying to escape from his pursuers by crossing the Vaal River. His body was recovered two days later, and with his death the rebellion was brought to an end.

Notes

References

1869 births
1914 deaths
Deaths by drowning
People from the Western Cape
Afrikaner people
South African people of Dutch descent
South African politicians
Boer generals
South African Republic military personnel of the Second Boer War
South African military personnel killed in World War I